Julia Goldani Telles (born March 18, 1995) is an American actress and ballet dancer. She is known for playing Sasha Torres on the short-lived ABC Family series Bunheads, Iris in the third season of The Girlfriend Experience and for her supporting role as Whitney Solloway on the Showtime original series The Affair.

Early life
Goldani Telles was born in Los Angeles, California to a Brazilian mother and Mexican father. She moved with her parents to Rio de Janeiro when she was almost two years old. It was there that she was introduced to the world of ballet at the age of five. When the family relocated back to Los Angeles that year, Goldani Telles could speak only Portuguese and learned English after the family's move. Goldani Telles moved to New York City when she was thirteen and attended Professional Children's School in Manhattan, New York.

Goldani Telles trained at the School of American Ballet and Ballet Academy East, and appeared in numerous ballet performances including Sleeping Beauty, Nutcracker, Don Quixote, and Swan Lake. A case of tendonitis and labral tears in her hips at the age of 15 forced Goldani Telles to stop practicing ballet for a year; to avoid depression, she decided to take a drama course.

Career
Goldani Telles studied at Columbia University. Her first role in television came in 2011 when she successfully auditioned for the part of Sasha Torres in ABC Family's Bunheads. She did so having never had an acting job before and without head-shots or a résumé. Her agent felt Bunheads should have been one of her first auditions as he felt she would be comfortable with the dancing aspect of the show. The pilot episode was filmed in November 2011. Bunheads was picked up to series and ran for eighteen episodes from June 11, 2012 to February 25, 2013.

As well as Bunheads, Goldani Telles also appeared in the Nat & Alex Wolff music video for the song "Greatest Prize" in early 2012.

She also guest starred on the Blue Bloods episode "The Bogeyman" which aired January 10, 2014.

Goldani Telles played the role of oldest daughter Whitney on the Showtime drama series The Affair.

In May, 2021, Goldani Telles starred as Iris in the third season of the Starz series The Girlfriend Experience.

Filmography

References

External links

1995 births
Living people
Actresses from Los Angeles
American people of Brazilian descent
American actresses of Mexican descent
American television actresses
American child actresses
Actresses from New York (state)
Actresses of Brazilian descent
21st-century American actresses
School of American Ballet alumni
Hispanic and Latino American actresses
Brazilian ballerinas
Brazilian ballet dancers